Vesicle-associated membrane protein 5 also known as VAMP5 is a human gene which encodes a member of the synaptobrevin protein family.

Function
VAMPs (synaptobrevins) along with syntaxins and the 25-kD synaptosomal-associated protein are the main components of a protein complex involved in the docking and/or fusion of vesicles and cell membranes. The VAMP5 gene is a member of the vesicle-associated membrane protein (VAMP)/synaptobrevin family and the SNARE superfamily. This VAMP family member may participate in vesicle trafficking events that are associated with myogenesis.

References

External links